The eighth series of the British medical drama television series Holby City commenced airing in the United Kingdom on BBC One on 18 October 2005, and concluded on 17 October 2006.

Cast

Main characters 

Kelly Adams as Mickie Hendrie (until episode 47)
Rakie Ayola as Kyla Tyson (from episode 17)
Adam Best as Matt Parker
Paul Bradley as Elliot Hope (from episode 4)

Sharon D. Clarke as Lola Griffin
Ade Edmondson as Abra Durant (from episode 33)
Michael French as Nick Jordan (episodes 11-37)
Paul Henshall as Dean West
Tina Hobley as Chrissie Williams

Jaye Jacobs as Donna Jackson
Verona Joseph as Jess Griffin (episode 15)
Rosie Marcel as Jac Naylor (from episode 6)
Sharon Maughan as Tricia Williams
Amanda Mealing as Connie Beauchamp

Patricia Potter as Diane Lloyd
Robert Powell as Mark Williams
Hugh Quarshie as Ric Griffin
Luke Roberts as Joseph Byrne (from episode 12)

Recurring and guest characters 
Scott Adkins as Bradley Hume (episodes 32–52)
Gillian Bevan as Gina Hope (episodes 23–52)
Martin Hancock as Reg Lund (until episode 52)
Andrew Lewis as Paul Rose
Alex Macqueen as Keith Greene
Ben Richards as Justin Fuller (episodes 23–37)
Patrick Toomey as Christopher Sutherland (from episode 25)

Episodes

Notes

References

08
2005 British television seasons
2006 British television seasons